In the Philippines, some universities follow a 4-Point Scale, which resembles or is equivalent to the U.S. grading system. This system uses a grade between 0.00 to 4.00 wherein 4.00 is the highest and 0.00 being a failing mark.

, or curriculum weighted average.

Grade point scale (1.00–5.00) 

Other universities, such as the Ateneo de Manila University and its sister schools, use the letter grade system with varied grade equivalence range.

The Grading System of San Beda University is zero-based in nature which implies no transmutations are to be made.

The description mentioned in the table was based on Tarlac State University (TSU) Student Handbook. In addition, the grade of "INC" is given if a student whose class standing for the semester is passing, fails to take the final examination or fails to complete other course requirements for valid reason (Chap. 8, Sec. 1, TSU Student Handbook).

Grade point scale (4.00–1.00) 

While most courses at De La Salle University-Manila maintain the above table for a passing grade of 60%, there are some courses where the passing grade can also be 50%, 55%, 65%, or 70%, in which the grade point equivalences would vary.

De La Salle University-Dasmariñas Grade Point System

Letter grade system 

Most academic departments in the university follow a grading system with the 70% passing grade. Some departments, such as the Department of Finance and Accounting and departments from the Ateneo School of Science and Engineering follow a 50% or 60% passing grade.

Latin Honors grade equivalences 
Some Philippine universities and colleges give Latin honors in conveying the level of distinction that an academic degree has been earned.

Prerequisite for UST's Latin Honors or Dean's Lister distinction are the following: QPI should be at least 86%, no grade below 80% for any subject in the given semester, and the student should obtain a good moral character.

References 

Philippines
Grading
Grading